Edible flowers are flowers that can be consumed safely. Flowers may be eaten as vegetables as a main part of a meal, or may be used as herbs. Flowers are part of many regional cuisines, including Asian, European, and Middle Eastern cuisines.

Uses

Edible flowers are added to foods to provide flavor, aroma, and decoration. They can be eaten as part of a main dish or be incorporated into salads. Flowers can be added to beverages as flavorings, or be used to make beverages such as tisanes and wines. They are added to spreads such as butter or fruit preserves, and to vinegar, marinades, and dressings.

Flowers are also consumed for sustenance. Many flowers that are technically edible can be far from palatable. An example of a species with flowers that are of high nutritional value is the dandelion, whose flowers are shown to contain high levels of polyphenols and antioxidants and possess anti-inflammatory and anti-angiogenic properties.

For the best flavor, flowers should be fresh and harvested early in the day. Wilted and faded flowers and the unopened buds of most species can be unpleasant and often bitter. The taste and color of nectar widely vary between different species of flower; consequently, honey may vary in color and taste depending on the species of flower. Many flowers can be eaten whole, but some have bitter parts, such as the stamens and stems.

Risks
Some flowers are safe to eat only in small amounts. Apple flowers (Malus spp.) contain cyanide precursors, and Johnny jump-ups (Viola tricolor) contain saponins. Borage (Borago officinalis) and daylily (Hemerocallis spp.) flowers are diuretics, and sweet woodruff (Galium odoratum) can have blood-thinning effects. The flowers of linden trees (Tilia spp.) are reportedly "safe in small amounts", but heavy consumption can cause heart damage. Marigolds (Tagetes spp.) can be harmful in large amounts, and only certain species have an appealing flavor.

Toxic flowers are easily mistaken for edible varieties, and unrelated safe and unsafe species may share a common name. Various non-toxic plants can cause severe allergies in some people. Flowers cultivated as ornamental plants for garden use are not intended for use as food.

Common edible flowers

A number of foods are types of flowers or are derived from parts of flowers.  The costly spice saffron consists of the stigmas and styles collected from the inside of a type of crocus flower.  Broccoli, artichokes, and capers are all technically flower buds, albeit immature forms. Other parts of the plants than the flowers mentioned in this list may be poisonous.

Flowers reported as edible include:
American elderberry (Sambucus canadensis)
Anise hyssop (Agastache foeniculum)
Arugula (Eruca sativa)
Banana blossom
Basil (Ocimum basilicum)
Bean (Phaseolus vulgaris)
Bergamot (Monarda didyma)
Black locust (only flowers). The flowers are used as tea, and in pancakes. Flowers are consumed as fritters in many parts of Europe.
Broccoli (Brassica oleracea var. italica)
Broussonetia kurzii
Butterfly pea (Clitoria ternatea)
Cauliflower (Brassica oleracea)
Chamomile (Chamaemelum nobile)
Chervil (Anthriscus cerefolium)
Chinese hibiscus (Hibiscus rosa-sinensis)
Chives (Allium schoenoprasum)
Chicory (Cichorium intybus)
Chickweed (Stellaria Media)
Chrysanthemum (Chrysanthemum spp.)
Cornflower (Centaurea cyanus)
Cosmos (C. Sulphureus) (C. Bipinatus)
Dandelion (Taraxacum officinale)
Dianthus (Dianthus spp.)
Dill (Anethum graveolens)
English marigold (Calendula officinalis)
English daisy (Bellis perennis)
Fennel (Foeniculum vulgare)
Geranium (Pelargonium spp.)
Hollyhock (Alcea rosea)
Japanese honeysuckle (Lonicera japonica) but not any other honeysuckle. Its berries are highly poisonous. 
Lavender (Lavandula spp.)
Lilac (Syringa vulgaris)
Lovage (Levisticum officinale)
Maguey flower (Agave spp.)
Mangrove trumpet tree (Dolichandrone spathacea)
Markhamia stipulata, similar to the Mangrove trumpet tree flower and sometimes confused with it.
Mint (Mentha spp.)
Nasturtium (Tropaeolum majus)
Okra (Abelmoschus esculentus)
Passionflower (Passiflora spp.)
Pineapple sage (Salvia elegans)
Red clover (Trifolium pratense)
Rose (Rosa spp.)
Rosemary (Rosmarinus officinalis)
Sage (Salvia officinalis)
Sesbania grandiflora, the most popular edible flower in South Asia and Southeast Asia.
Snapdragon (Antirrhinum majus)
Squash (Cucurbita pepo)
Sunflower (Helianthus annuus)
Thyme (Thymus vulgaris)
Violet (Viola odorata)

See also 
Kitchen garden
Hwajeon, a small sweet pancake made with edible flower petals

References

Further reading
Barash, C. W. Edible Flowers from Garden to Palate. Golden: Fulcrum Publishing, 1993.
Brown, K. Flowerpower. New York: Anness Publishing Limited, 2000.
Mead, C. and E. Tolley. A Potpourri of Pansies. New York: Clarkson Potter Publishers, 1993.
Strowbridge, C. and F. Tillona. A Feast of Flowers. New York: Funk & Wagnalls, 1969.

External links
Edible Flowers. University of Kentucky Cooperative Extension. 2012.
Jauron, R., et al. Edible Flowers. Iowa State University Extension and Outreach. 2013.
Levitt, B. Cooking with edible flowers. San Diego Union-Tribune March 26, 2013.

Garden plants
 
Flower dishes